A by-election was held for the New South Wales Legislative Assembly electorate of Wollombi on 17 December 1886 because of the resignation of Lyall Scott due to ill health.

Dates

Candidates

 Richard Stevenson was a retired journalist who had previously stood unsuccessfully for Grafton and The Clarence.

 Walter Vivian was an estate agent from Manly who had contested Wollombi in 1885, defeated by a margin of 335 votes (35.5%).

This was at the emergence of political parties in New South Wales, and both candidates declared their support for free trade.

Result

Lyall Scott resigned.

See also
Electoral results for the district of Wollombi
List of New South Wales state by-elections

References

1886 elections in Australia
New South Wales state by-elections
1880s in New South Wales